Dave Hibberd (born 16 August 1965) is a South African sailor. He competed in the Laser event at the 1996 Summer Olympics.

References

External links
 

1965 births
Living people
South African male sailors (sport)
Olympic sailors of South Africa
Sailors at the 1996 Summer Olympics – Laser
Place of birth missing (living people)